Afro-Jamaicans are Jamaicans of predominant Sub-Saharan African descent. They represent the largest ethnic group in the country. Most Jamaicans of mixed-race descent self-report as just Jamaican.

The ethnogenesis of the Black Jamaican people stemmed from the Atlantic slave trade of the 16th century, when enslaved Africans were transported as slaves to Jamaica and other parts of the Americas. The first Africans to arrive in Jamaica came in 1513 from the Iberian Peninsula. When the English invaded Jamaica in 1655, many of them fought with their Spanish masters, who gave them their freedom, and then fled to the mountains, resisting the English colonial administration for decades, becoming known as Maroons. During the period of British rule, slaves brought into Jamaica were primarily Akan, some of whom ran away and joined with Maroons and even took over as leaders.

Origin 
West Africans were captured and enslaved in wars with other West African states, as retribution for crimes committed within a state or by abduction by either African or European slavers, and marched to the coast in "coffles" with their necks yoked to each other. The most common means of enslaving an African was through abduction. They were placed in trading posts or forts to await the six- to twelve-week Middle Passage voyage between Africa and the Americas during which they were chained together, underfed, and kept in the ship's hold by the thousands. Those who survived were fattened up and oiled to look healthy prior to being auctioned in public squares to the highest bidders.

Ethnicities 
Based on slave ship records, enslaved Africans mostly came from the Akan people (Akwamu, Ashanti, Akyem Fante and Bono) followed by Igbo people, Ibibio people, Kongo people, the Yoruba and the Fon people. Akan (then called Coromantee) culture was the dominant African culture in Jamaica.

Originally in earlier British colonization, the island before the 1750s was in fact mainly Akan imported. However, between 1663 and 1700, only six per cent of slave ships to Jamaica listed their origin as the Gold Coast, while between 1700 and 1720 that figure went up to 27 per cent. The number of Akan slaves arriving in Jamaica from Kormantin ports only increased in the early eighteenth century. But due to frequent rebellions from the then known "Coromantee" that often joined the slave rebellion group known as the Jamaican Maroons, other groups were sent to Jamaica. The Akan population was still maintained because they were the preference of British planters in Jamaica because they were "better workers", according to these Planters. According to the Slave Voyages Archives, though the Igbo had the highest importation numbers, they were only imported to Montego Bay and St. Ann's Bay ports, while the Gold Coast (mainly Akan) were more dispersed across the island and were a majority imported to seven of 14 of the island's ports (each parish has one port).

Field slaves fetched £25–75 while skilled slaves such as carpenters fetched prices as high as £300. The majority of the house slaves were mulattoes. On reaching the plantation, the slaves underwent a "seasoning" process in which they were placed with an experienced slave who taught them the ways of the estate. Although the initial slave traders were the Portuguese and the Dutch, between 1750 and 1807 (the year in which the British Empire abolished the slave trade), Britain "dominated the buying and selling of slaves to the Americas". They were also Brown/Mulatto or mixed race people at the time who had more privileges than the Black slaves and usually held higher-paying jobs and occupations. Shipbuilding flourished and manufacturing expanded: the "process of industrialization in England from the second quarter of the eighteenth century as to an important extent a response to colonial demands for rails, axes, buckets, coaches, clocks, saddles...and a thousand other things".

History

Atlantic slave trade 

The Atlantic slave trade began in the 15th century when the Portuguese took hold of land near Gibraltar and soon encountered Africans, whom they quickly took as prisoners. By mid-century, the first public sale of these prisoners was held. By 1455 Portugal was importing close to 800 enslaved Africans a year. Sugar cultivation began in the Azores islands, and as the demand for sugar grew, so did the demand for slaves to work the fields of sugar cane. By the 16th century, other countries wanted a piece of this action and the competition for the sugar and enslavement trades began.

By 1700 Jamaica was awash with sugar plantations and Jamaica's population consisted of 7,000 English to 40,000 enslaved Africans. The sugar industry grew  quickly in Jamaica—in 1672 there were 70 plantations producing 772 tonnes of sugar per annum—growing in the 1770s to over 680 plantations. By 1800, it was 21,000 English to 300,000 enslaved Africans. In 1820 there were 5,349 properties in Jamaica of which 1,189 contained over 100 enslaved Africans.  Each estate was its own small world, complete with an entire labour force of field workers and skilled artisans, a hospital, water supply, cattle, mules and horses as well as its own fuel source. Each plantation fuelled the wheels of British mercantilism. Sugar, molasses and rum were exported to England for sale and ships were financed to return to Africa and collect more slaves in exchange for trinkets and transport them to the West Indies as a labour source. This became known as the Triangular Trade. Money was not left in England's colonies—the financing came from Mother England, and to Mother England the profits returned.

Sugar estates 

This included a Great House where the owner or overseer and the domestic enslaved Africans lived, and nearby accommodation for the bookkeeper, distiller, mason, carpenter, blacksmith, cooper and wheelwright. With the exception of the bookkeeper, by the middle of the eighteenth century, skilled enslaved Africans had replaced white indentured servants in these posts. The field enslavement' quarters were usually about a half mile away, closer to the industrial sugar mill, distillery and the boiling and curing houses, as well as the blacksmiths' and carpenters' sheds and thrash houses. In addition, there was a poultry pen and a cattle yard along with a hospital for Africans. Some estates, if large enough, had accommodation for an estate doctor. Estates had estate gardens and the Africans had their own kitchen gardens as well as polnicks  provision grounds found in the hills, which were required by law from as early as 1678. During enslavement, however, the enslaved Africans kept pigs and poultry and grew mangoes, plantain, ackee, okra, yam and other ground provisions. The cultivation of these lands took on greater proportions as plantations were abandoned when the island faced increasing competition from Brazil, Cuba and beet sugar, a loss in labour after emancipation in the 1830s as well as the loss of protective trade duties after the passage of the 1846 Sugar Equalization Act in England.

The workforce on each plantation was divided into gangs determined by age and fitness. On average most estates had three main field gangs. The first was made up of the strongest and most able men and women. The second, of those no longer able to serve in the first, and the third, of older enslaved Africans and older children. Some estates had four gangs, depending on the number of children living on the estate. Children started working as young as 3 or 4 years old.

Significance of sugar 

To a large extent, Jamaican customs and culture were fashioned by sugar. According to John Hearne (1965), for two hundred years sugar was the only reason behind Jamaica's existence as a centre for human habitation. For centuries, sugar was Jamaica's most important crop. Jamaica was once considered the "jewel" in Britain's crown. In 1805, the island's peak of sugar production, it produced 101,600 tonnes of sugar. It was the world's leading individual sugar producer.

The cultivation of sugar was intricately intertwined with the system of African enslavement. This connection has set the course of the nation's demographics since the 18th century when enslaved Africans vastly outnumbered any other population group. The descendants of the  enslaved Africans comprise the majority of Jamaica's population. They have influenced every sphere of Jamaican life and their contributions are immeasurable.

Culture 
Jamaican enslaved peoples came from West/Central Africa and South-East Africa. Many of their customs survived based on memory and myths. They encompassed the life cycle, i.e. a newborn was not regarded as being of this world until nine days had passed and burial often involved libations at the graveside, and the belief that the dead body's spirit would not be at rest for some 42 days (a derivative of the Ashanti beliefs like Adae Kese Festival). They included forms of religion in which healing was considered an act of faith completed by obeahmen and communication with the spirits involved possession often induced by dancing and drumming. African-based religions include Myal and Revival and later Kumina from Congolese immigrants. Many involved recreational, ceremonial and functional use of music and dance. "Slaves," Brathwaite explains, "danced and sang at work, at play, at worship, from fear, from sorrow from joy". They recreated African musical instruments from materials found in Jamaica (calabash, conch, bamboo, etc.) and featured improvisation in song and dance. All of these customs and many more such as the Christmas street parades of Jonkonnu, were misunderstood and undervalued by Europeans with the exception of the political use of drumming to send coded messages from plantation to plantation. Drumming of any kind was therefore often banned. Jamaican music today has emerged from the traditional musical forms of work songs sung by slaves, the ceremonial music used in religious services and the social and recreational music played on holidays and during leisure time. The cramped housing space provided to the enslaved Africans, which limited their dwellings (often made of wattle and daub) to one window and one door, meant that very little other than sleeping took place indoors. Life, as in Africa, was lived communally, outside. Similarly language, as in Africa, is considered powerful, particularly naming. Brathwaite (1971) gives an example of a woman whose child falls ill and wants her name to be changed, believing that this would allow her to be cured. Language is certainly an area where African retention is strongest. Jamaicans today move between Patois a creolised English and standard English. Jamaican patois was born from the intermixing of African slaves and English, Irish, Welsh, Scottish sailors, enslaved Africans, servants, soldiers and merchants. The enslaved African spoke many dialects, and given the need for a common tongue, Jamaican patois was born. It has been in use since the end of the 17th century by Jamaicans of all ethnicities and has been added to by the, Chinese, Hakka, Indians, Lebanese, Germans, and French who also settled on the island. Some words also indicate Spanish and Taino presence in Jamaican history. Many of these traditions survive to this day, testament to the strength of West African culture despite the process of creolisation (the intermingling of peoples adjusting to a new environment) it encountered.

Myal and Revival 
Kumfu (from the word Akom the name of the Akan spiritual system) was documented as Myal and originally only found in books, while the term Kumfu is still used by Jamaican Maroons. The priest of Kumfu was called a Kumfu-man. In 18th-century Jamaica, only Akan gods were worshipped by Akan as well as by other enslaved Africans. The Akan god of creation, Nyankopong was given praise but not worshipped directly. They poured libation to Asase Ya, the goddess of the earth. But nowadays they are only observed by the Maroons who preserved a lot of the culture of 1700s Jamaica.

"Myal" or Kumfu evolved into Revival, a syncretic Christian sect. Kumfu followers gravitated to the American Revival of 1800 Seventh Day Adventist movement because it observed Saturday as god's day of rest. This was a shared aboriginal belief of the Akan people as this too was the day that the Akan god, Nyame, rested after creating the earth. Jamaicans that were aware of their Ashanti past while wanting to keep hidden, mixed their Kumfu spirituality with the American Adventists to create Jamaican Revival in 1860. Revival has two sects: 60 order (or Zion Revival, the order of the heavens) and 61 order (or Pocomania, the order of the earth). 60 order worships God and spirits of air or the heavens on a Saturday and considers itself to be the more 'clean' sect. 61 order more deals with spirits of the earth. This division of Kumfu clearly shows the dichotomy of Nyame and Asase Yaa's relationship, Nyame representing air and has his 60 order'; Asase Yaa having her 61 order of the earth. Also the Ashanti funerary/war colours: red and black have the same meaning in Revival of vengeance. Other Ashanti elements include the use of swords and rings as means to guard the spirit from spiritual attack. The Asantehene like the Mother Woman of Revival, has special two swords used to protect himself from witchcraft called an Akrafena or soul sword and a Bosomfena or spirit sword.

John Canoe 
A festival was dedicated to the heroism of the Akan king 'John Canoe' an Ahanta from Axim, Ghana in 1708. See John Canoe section.

Jamaican Patois 

Jamaican Patois, known locally as Patwa, is an English creole language spoken primarily in Jamaica and the Jamaican diaspora. It is not to be confused with Jamaican English nor with the Rastafarian use of English. The language developed in the 17th century, when enslaved peoples from West and Central Africa blended their dialect and terms with the learned vernacular and dialectal forms of English spoken: British Englishes (including significant exposure to Scottish English) and Hiberno English.  Jamaican Patwa is a post-creole speech continuum (a linguistic continuum) meaning that the variety of the language closest to the lexifier language (the acrolect) cannot be distinguished systematically from intermediate varieties (collectively referred to as the mesolect) nor even from the most divergent rural varieties (collectively referred to as the basilect). Jamaicans themselves usually refer to their use of English as patwa, a term without a precise linguistic definition.

Jamaican Patois contains many loanwords of African origin, a majority of those etymologically from Gold Coast region (particularly of the Asante-Twi dialect of the Akan language of Ghana).

Proverbs 
Most Jamaican proverbs are of Asante people, while some included other African proverbs.

Genetic studies

Jamaican mtDNA 
A DNA test study submitted to BMC Medicine in 2012 states that "....despite the historical evidence that an overwhelming majority of slaves were sent from the Bight of Biafra and West-central Africa near the end of the British slave trade, the mtDNA haplogroup profile of modern Jamaicans show a greater affinity with groups found in the present-day Gold Coast region Ghana....this is because Africans arriving from the Gold Coast may have thus found the acclimatization and acculturation process less stressful because of cultural and linguistic commonalities, leading ultimately to a greater chance of survivorship and a greater number of progeny."

More detailed results stated: "Using haplogroup distributions to calculate parental population contribution, the largest admixture coefficient was associated with the Gold Coast(0.477 ± 0.12 or 59.7% of the Jamaican population with a 2.7 chance of Pygmy and Sahelian mixture), suggesting that the people from this region may have been consistently prolific throughout the slave era on Jamaica. The diminutive admixture coefficients associated with the Bight of Biafra and West-central Africa (0.064 ± 0.05 and 0.089 ± 0.05, respectively) is striking considering the massive influx of individuals from these areas in the waning years of the British Slave trade. When excluding the pygmy groups, the contribution from the Bight of Biafra and West-central rise to their highest levels (0.095 ± 0.08 and 0.109 ± 0.06, respectively), though still far from a major contribution. When admixture coefficients were calculated by assessing shared haplotypes, the Gold Coast also had the largest contribution, though much less striking at 0.196, with a 95% confidence interval of 0.189 to 0.203. When haplotypes are allowed to differ by one base pair, the Jamaican matriline shows the greatest affinity with the Bight of Benin, though both Bight of Biafra and West-central Africa remain underrepresented. The results of the admixture analysis suggest the mtDNA haplogroup profile distribution of Jamaica more closely resembles that of aggregated populations from the modern-day Gold Coast region despite an increasing influx of individuals from both the Bight of Biafra and West-central Africa during the final years of trading enslaved Africans.

The aforementioned results apply to subjects whom have been tested. Results also stated that black Jamaicans (that make up over 90% of the population) on an average have 97.5% of African MtDNA and very little European or Asian ancestry could be found.  Both ethnic and racial genetic results are based on a low sample of 390 Jamaican persons and limited regional representation within Jamaica. As Afro-Jamaicans are not genetically homogeneous, the results for other subjects may yield different results.

Jamaican Y-DNA 
Pub Med results were also issued in the same year (2012): "Our results reveal that the studied population of Jamaica exhibit a predominantly South-Saharan paternal component, with haplogroups A1b-V152, A3-M32, B2-M182, E1a-M33, E1b1a-M2, E2b-M98, and R1b2-V88 comprising 66.7% of the Jamaican paternal gene pool. Yet, European derived chromosomes (i.e., haplogroups G2a*-P15, I-M258, R1b1b-M269, and T-M184) were detected at commensurate levels in  Jamaica (18.9%), whereas Y-haplogroups indicative of Chinese [O-M175 (3.8%)] and Indian [H-M69 (0.6%) and L-M20 (0.6%)] ancestry were restricted to Jamaica. African paternal DNA 66.7%
European paternal DNA 18.9%
Chinese paternal DNA 3.8%
Indian paternal DNA 1.2%

Jamaican autosomal DNA 
The gene pool of Jamaica is about 78.3% Sub-Saharan African, 16% European, and 5.7% East Asian; according to a 2010 autosomal genealogical DNA testing.

Notable Afro-Jamaicans 
 Adrian Mariappa (Jamaican mother)
 Ainsley Maitland-Niles (Jamaican parents)
 Andre Wisdom (Jamaican parents)
 Anton Walkes (jamaican father)
 Bobby De Cordova-Reid (Jamaican parents)
 Brandon Clarke (Jamaican Father)
 Cheyna Matthews (Jamaican father)
 Chinyelu Asher (Jamaican father)
 Craig Eastmond (Jamaican parents)
 Danny Gabbidon (Jamaican father)
 Danny Simpson (Jamaican father)
 Darius Vassell (Jamaican Parents)
 Darren Mattocks
 Demar Phillips
 Deshorn Brown
 Dever Orgill
 Djed Spence (Jamaican father)
 Fraizer Campbell (Jamaican parents)
 Giles Barnes (Jamaican parents)
 Javain Brown
 Jermaine Beckford (Jamaican father)
 John Barnes (Jamaican mother)
 Junior Morias
 Kasey Palmer (Jamaican parents)
 Kevin Lisbie (Jamaican parents)
 Marcus Barnes (Jamaican parents)
 Mason Greenwood (Jamaican parents)
 Matty McNeil (Jamaican Father)
 Buju Banton
 Beenie Man
 Big Youth
 Black Uhuru
 Usain Bolt
 Paul Bogle
 Yohan Blake 
 Dennis Brown
 Bounty Killer
 Naomi Campbell (Jamaican parents)
 Sol Campbell (Jamaican parents)
 Capleton
 Daniel Caesar (Jamaican father)
 Chalice
 Jimmy Cliff
 Kevin Michael Richardson (Jamaican Father)
 Derek Cornelius (Jamaican mother)
 Desmond Dekker
 DJ Kool Herc
 Ricardo Fuller
 Ricardo Gardner
 Marcus Garvey
 Chris Gayle
 Beres Hammond
 Kamala Harris (Jamaican father)
 Heavy D (Jamaican parents)
 Patrick Ewing
 Patrick Ewing Jr. (Jamaican parents)
 George William Gordon
 Marion Hall
 Jason Puncheon (Jamaican parents)
 Joseph Hill
 Kofi Cockburn
 I Wayne
 Inner Circle
 Yazmeen Jamieson (Jamaican father)
 Grace Jones
 Vybz Kartel
 Koffee
 Jonathan Lewis (Jamaican father)
 Bob Marley
 Damian Marley
 Ziggy Marley
 Morgan Heritage
 Mustard
 Claude McKay
 The Notorious B.I.G. (Jamaican parents)
 Lee "Scratch" Perry
 Mike McCallum
 Colin Powell (Jamaican parents of mixed African and Scottish ancestry)
 Sheryl Lee Ralph (Jamaican mother)
 Shabba Ranks
 Lennox Lewis (Jamaican parents)
 Danny Ray (Jamaican parents, based in the United Kingdom)
 Trevor D. Rhone
 Joey Badass (Jamaican father)
 Capital Steez (Jamaican parents)
 Floyd Mayweather Jr. (Jamaican Grandmother)
 Busta Rhymes (Jamaican parents)
 Queen Nanny
 Pop Smoke (Jamaican mother)
 Shaggy
 Errol Spence Jr. (Jamaican father)
 Samuel Sharpe
 Raheem Sterling (Jamaican parents)
 NLE Choppa (Jamaican mother)
 Uncle Luke (Jamaican father)
 Super Cat
 Third World
 Peter Tosh
 Tyson Beckford (Jamaican parents)
 Bunny Wailer
 Ella Mai (Jamaican mother)
 Courtney Walsh
 XXXTentacion (Jamaican parents)
 Aljamain Sterling (Jamaican parents)
 Jamelia (Jamaican parents)
 Emily Maddison
 Callum Robinson (Jamaican father)
 Dujon Sterling (Jamaican parents)
 Deanne Rose (Jamaican parents)
 Jamoi Topey
 Mustard (record producer) (Jamaican parents)
 Labrinth (Jamaican parents)
 Lamar Walker
 Lauren James (Jamaican father)
 Alvas Powell
 Kerry Washington (Jamaican mother)
 Donovan Ruddock
 Pete Rock (Jamaican parents)
 Lamont Bryan (Jamaican mother)
 Leon Bailey
 Pepa
 Matt Phillips (Jamaican father)
 Max Aarons (Jamaican father)
 Mel Gaynor (Jamaican father)
 Omar Richards (Jamaican parents)
 Owayne Gordon
 Peter-Lee Vassell
 Reece James (Jamaican father)
 Rimario Gordon
 Rolando Aarons
 Sanchez Watt (Jamaican father)
 Sean Johnson (Jamaican Father)
 Shane Paul McGhie (Jamaican father)
 Tashan Oakley-Boothe (Jamaican parents)
 Tyrick Mitchell (Jamaican parents)
 Ndamukong Suh (jamaican mother)
 Havana Solaun (Jamaican mother)
 Isaac Hayden (jamaican mother)
 Jobi McAnuff (Jamaican father)
 Jourdaine Fletcher
 Justin McMaster (Jamaican parents)
 Khari Stephenson
 Olufolasade Adamolekun (Jamaican Mother)
 Nathaniel Adamolekun (Jamaican mother)
 Wes Morgan (Jamaican parents)
 Pete Wentz (Jamaican mother)
 Rachelle Smith (Jamaican parents)
 Roy Hibbert (Jamaican Father)
 Shenseea (Jamaican mother)
 Tajon Buchanan (Jamaican parents)
 Zavon Hines
 Omari Caro (Jamaican father)
 Konya Plummer
 Deneisha Blackwood
 Melvin Brown (Jamaican father)
 Khadija Shaw
 Asafa Powell
 Robin Fraser
 Colorado Murray
 Cory Burke
 Chavany Willis

See also 

 Coromantee
 Dancehall
 Dub music
 Jonkanoo
 Mento
 Old school jungle
 Passa Passa
 Reggae
 Rocksteady
 Ska

References 

Afro-Jamaican
Ethnic groups in Jamaica
Society of the Caribbean